Henri Myntti (born 23 March 1982) is a Finnish footballer who plays for KPV Kokkola.

Club career 

Born in Kokkola, Myntti began his career at his hometown Kokkola's top club KPV. In March 2001 he was signed as a promising youth player by the Norwegian Tippeligaen side Tromsø IL. Failing to secure a place in the Tromsø squad, he was loaned out twice during his stay at the club. In 2002, he joined FC Hämeenlinna in mid-season to make his Veikkausliiga debut. In 2003, he played the whole season at another Veikkausliiga side, FF Jaro of Jakobstad. In July 2004 his contract with Tromsø was terminated.

After leaving Norway, Myntti returned home to play for KPV in the Finnish second tier Ykkönen. After a successful spell at KPV, he was signed by the defending Finnish champions Tampere United for the 2007 season. He won the league title with Tampere as well as the Finnish Cup in 2007.

After a disappointing early season for Tampere United in 2008, the manager Ari Hjelm decided to try Myntti out as a striker. He has since emerged as one of the most prolific goalscorers in Veikkausliiga. In the 2008 season, Myntti won the title of top scorer in the Veikkausliiga.

In January 2009, it was announced that he would transfer to Hansa Rostock. Myntti scored his first goal for the Rostock side on 6 March 2009 against FC St. Pauli. Even though his team got an early lead, the Hamburger won the match 2–3. After the season, he was suspended from the club. After struggling to make a further impact, he was released from his contract by mutual consent on 11 November 2009. On 22 December 2009, he signed a two-year contract with Tampere United.

Position 

He is a tall central defender who can also play as striker.

International career 

Myntti was capped 12 times for the Finnish national under-21 team. He also has caps at other youth levels.

Personal life 

Myntti's grandfather, Stig-Göran Myntti, was a regular member of the Finnish national team in the 1940s and 1950s. His father was also capped at youth level.

Honours 

 Finnish Championship: 2007
 Finnish Cup: 2007
 Top scorer in Veikkausliiga: 2008

References 

1982 births
Living people
People from Kokkola
Finnish footballers
Veikkausliiga players
Eliteserien players
Tromsø IL players
FC Hämeenlinna players
FF Jaro players
Tampere United players
FC Hansa Rostock players
2. Bundesliga players
Finnish expatriate footballers
Expatriate footballers in Norway
Finnish expatriate sportspeople in Norway
Expatriate footballers in Germany
Finnish expatriate sportspeople in Germany
Kokkolan Palloveikot players
Association football central defenders
Association football forwards
Sportspeople from Central Ostrobothnia